The discography of Kasey Chambers, an Australian singer-songwriter, consists of twelve studio albums; five of which have peaked at number one on the ARIA Charts.

Studio albums

Soundtrack albums

Video albums

Extended plays

Singles

Music videos

Other contributions
 2000: various artists - Maybe Baby - Original Soundtrack (Virgin Records) – "Cry Like A Baby"
 2000: Slim Dusty - Looking Forward Looking Back (EMI) – "Matilda No More"
 2001: various artists - 107.1 KGSR Radio Austin - Broadcasts Vol.9 (KGSR) – "Tear Stained Eyes"
 2002: Speedstar - Bruises You Can Touch EMI) – "It's Okay To Be Sad When It Rains"
 2002: various artists - 107.1 KGSR Radio Austin - Broadcasts Vol.10 (KGSR) – "Not Pretty Enough"
 2002: various artists - Hear Music Vol 8 - Between Stories (Hear Music) – "Not Pretty Enough"
 2003: various artists - 107.1 KGSR Radio Austin - Broadcasts Vol.11 (KGSR) – "The Captain"
 2003: various artists - Just Because I'm a Woman: Songs of Dolly Parton (Sugar Hill – "Little Sparrow"
 2005: Paul Kelly and the Stormwater Boys - EMI / Capitol (Gawd Aggie) – "You're Learning"
 2005: various artists - She Will Have Her Way: The Songs of Tim & Neil Finn (EMI) – "Better Be Home Soon"
 2007: Jimmy Barnes - Out In The Blue (Liberation Music) – "When Two Hearts Collide"
 2009: Adam Harvey - Both Sides Now (Sony Music Australia) - "In the Jailhouse Now" with Shane Nicholson
 2010: John Williamson - Absolute Greatest: 40 Years True Blue (EMI Music) - "Cootamundra Wattle"
 2010: various artists - Long Gone Whistle - The Songs Of Maurice Frawley (Liberation Music) – "Hold On" (with Shane Nicholson)
 2011: various artists - Floodlight - Barnes Family Songs For Flood Relief (Liberation Music) – "When Two Hearts Collide" (with Jimmy Barnes)
 2015: various artists - Cold And Bitter Tears: The Songs Of Ted Hawkins (Eight 30) – "Cold And Bitter Tears" (with Bill Chambers)
 2020: various artists - Cannot Buy My Soul: The Songs of Kev Carmody - "Black Bess" with Jimmy Barnes
 2021: Paul Kelly - Paul Kelly's Christmas Train "The Friend Beasts" (with Dan Kelly)

As composer
 2004: Nancy Sinatra and Lee Hazlewood - Nancy & Lee 3 (Boots / Warner Music) - track 2, "Barricades & Brickwalls" (co-written with Bill Chambers and Steven Mark Werchon)
 2004: Ricky Koole - Who's Suzy? (Brigadoon Vocal) - track 13, "A Little Bit Lonesome"
 2005: Catherine Durand - Diaporama (Zone3) - track 9, "I Still Pray"
 2014: Bob Seger - Ride Out (Capitol / Hideout) - track 5, "Adam and Eve" (co-written with Shane Nicholson)
 2015: Flatt Lonesome - Runaway Train (Mountain Home Music) - track 12, "Runaway Train" (co-written with Steven Mark Werchon)

References

Discographies of Australian artists
Country music discographies